Youngs Peak is a small mountain located on the western side of the West Elk Mountains just east of and overlooking Crawford, Colorado. Although much of the mountain is covered with sedimentary rocks, Saddle Mountain is an exposed igneous intrusion that geologists call a laccolith.

The summit of Youngs Peak can be accessed by a hiking trail or by a four-wheel drive road. The top offers 360 degree views of the surrounding area with Needle Rock and the West Elk Mountains to the east, Crawford State Park to the south, the Black Canyon uplift and Gunnison Gorge National Conservation Area to the east, and Grand Mesa and North Fork of the Gunnison River valley to the north.

References

External links
Topographical map

West Elk Mountains
Mountains of Delta County, Colorado
Landforms of Delta County, Colorado
Gunnison National Forest